Ludvig Holberg, Baron of Holberg (3 December 1684 – 28 January 1754) was a writer, essayist, philosopher, historian and playwright born in Bergen, Norway, during the time of the Dano-Norwegian dual monarchy. He was influenced by Humanism, the Enlightenment and the Baroque. Holberg is considered the founder of modern Danish and Norwegian literature. He is best known for the comedies he wrote in 1722–1723 for the Lille Grønnegade Theatre in Copenhagen. Holberg's works about natural and common law were widely read by many Danish law students over two hundred years, from 1736 to 1936.

Studies and teaching 
Holberg was the youngest of six brothers. His father, Christian Nielsen Holberg, died before Ludvig was one year old. He was educated in Copenhagen, and was a teacher at the University of Copenhagen for many years. At the same time, he started his successful career as an author, writing the first of a series of comedies.

He began to study theology at the University of Copenhagen and later taught himself law, history and language. He was not particularly interested in theology as a career, settling for an attestats (similar to a Bachelor's degree today), which gave him the right to work as a priest; he did not attempt a baccalaureus, magister or doctorate in the subject, nor did he follow a career as a theology professor, priest, or bishop. In Holberg's youth, it was common to study theology and specialize according to one's degree, for example in Greek, Latin, philosophy or history. For the purpose of becoming a lawyer, it was normal to study abroad. In 1736 the Danish Lawyer degree was established at the University of Copenhagen, a degree which continued to be granted for 200 years, and for which Holberg's writings remained common reading material throughout this time. Holberg was formally appointed assistant professor after having first worked as one without pay. He had to accept the first available position, which was teaching metaphysics. Later, he became a professor and taught rhetoric and Latin. Finally, he was given a professorship in the subject which he prized most and was most productive in, history.

Holberg was well-educated and well-traveled. In his adolescence, he visited large cities in countries such as the Netherlands and France, and lived for a short period of time in Rome; and for a longer period of time in Oxford, England (1706–1708), which was rare during that time as intellectual life was centered in continental Europe. He was not formally admitted to Oxford University, but spent his time there using the libraries and participating in Latin discussions with the English students.

Writings 

Holberg's travels were a main inspiration in his later writings these experiences matured him both artistically and morally. Holberg let himself be inspired by old Latin comedies and newer French comedies he had seen in Paris, and street theaters in Rome.

His writings can be divided into three periods, during which he produced mainly history, 1711–1718; mainly satirical poetry and stage comedies, 1719–1731; and mainly philosophy, 1731–1750. His rich output of comedies during the middle period was shaped by his role as house dramatist at Denmark's first public theater, opened in Copenhagen in 1721. These comedies are the works on which his fame rests today, and they were an immediate and immense success. However the poverty caused by the Copenhagen Fire of 1728, brought a wave of depression and puritanism upon the nation, which clashed with Holberg's satirical works, and as a consequence he gave up his comedies switching to philosophical and historical writings in 1731. Holberg's only novel, the satirical science-fiction/fantasy Niels Klim's Underground Travels was originally published in Latin in 1741 as Nicolai Klimii Iter Subterraneum.

Ideology 
In Paris, Holberg met the Danish-born French scientist Jacob Winsløw, who was Catholic. Winsløw tried to convert Holberg, without success. Holberg enjoyed the debate, but it started a rumor in Copenhagen that Holberg had converted to Catholicism as Winsløw had, and as a consequence he felt it necessary to deny this to the Danish public, giving voice to anti-Catholic views on several occasions.

Holberg criticized school doctrines in Christianity, arguing that "Children must be made into men, before they can become Christians" and
"If one learns Theology, before learning to become a man, one will never become a man."

Holberg believed in people's inner divine light of reason, and to him it was important that the first goal of education was to teach students to use their senses and intellect, instead of uselessly memorising school books. This was a new, modern understanding of the question of religion, and it shows he was a man of the Age of Enlightenment. Holberg was interested in intellect because he felt that this is what binds society together. He also wondered why there was so much evil in the world, especially when one could let reason lead the way. One could say that he distanced himself from a religious explanation of evil towards a rational/empirical train of thought, and this is important because of his status as an author; both in his time and ours.

Holberg was open to biblical criticism, and Holberg's religious representation was, for the most part, deism. He was critical of the notion of original sin, instead subscribing to the notion of man's free will.

Holberg's declared intentions with his authorship were to enlighten people to better society. This also fits in with the picture of Holberg as of the age of enlightenment. It is worth noting that Holberg enjoyed larger cities with deep culture – small cities and nature did not interest him.

Like many scholars of his time, Holberg also influenced science. Holberg's concept for science was that it should be inductive (through experience built on observations) and practical to use. One example is his Betænkning over den nu regierende Qvæg-Syge (Memorandum on the prevalent cattle disease), (1745) where he reasons that the disease is caused by microorganisms.

Finances

In youth 
Holberg had to live a modest life in his youth and early adulthood. He earned a living as a tutor and as a travel companion for noblemen and tried to work as a private sports coach at the university. He received further support from a grant to travel to other universities in other countries, namely Protestant universities, but it was a condition he did not respect since he searched out those places where the discussion were the loudest and the experiences were the largest.

During his stay in England, Holberg set his eyes on academic authoring and on his return, he started writing about history. Later, he wrote also about natural and international law, possibly at the prompting of an older professor who likened him to natural and international law authors such as Hugo Grotius and Samuel Pufendorf.

To make the most possible profit, Holberg published his own works and sold them as papers under a subscription to interested people, either bound or in looseleaf sheets. Holberg also tried, with some success, a publisher in Norway. There, his book about natural and international law was printed in several editions but did not garner him financial gains.

Investments 
Holberg lived modestly and was able to invest a large part of the profits from the sale of his books on the side and lend them out or invest them in more active ventures. Several times in his writings he criticized townspeople and nobles who used their resources in unproductive ways to be carried round in chairs, to live in lavish houses and waste money on luxury. He ate reasonably and did not use his money on being driven around. He said that his travelling on foot, and continued walking, was the reason he could keep his malaria, which had plagued him in the south, under control.

When he came to the conclusion he could put his money in better ventures than trading, he started investing in real estate. His first large property purchase, Brorupgaard close to Havrebjerg, happened in stages; first he lent money to the owner at that time, and later took over the farm himself.

Some years later, Holberg also purchased Tersløsegard by Dianalund, the only one of his properties which is preserved because the others in Bergen, Copenhagen and Havrebjerg have been either burned down or torn down.

Sorø Academy and Holberg's will;
Holberg was both unmarried and childless, but in the end of his life had a small fortune. He was interested in leaving a legacy and left his estate to Sorø Academy, which was a royal riding academy, with the goal of creating an institution at a university level for young men coming from nobility. Holberg supported the idea of the academy, worked out suggestions to which academic direction it would take and was asked by the king's superintendent to refer some professors for the school. The influential Enlightenment writer Jens Schielderup Sneedorff was appointed professor at Sorø Academy at Holbergs request.

The agreement with the king included that Holberg would be free of taxes from any income from the farms he owned, because the amount donated to the school should be larger than the amount he would pay in taxes. At the same time, he earned the title of Baron of Holberg.

Holberg's casket, a work of Johannes Wiedewelt, can be seen in Sorø Monastery Church.

Examples of Holberg's financial management 
It can be seen from Holberg's correspondence that he was very conservative with money where he thought it would not be of any use; for example, he was against raising the wage of the pedagogues of Havrebjerg.

Holberg commented several times that he was willing to use money if it were put to good use, for example, he would use money on medication and supplies for his farm hands if they suffered from injury or illness.

When academia had large economic difficulties, because funding was very limited, Holberg agreed to help fund the academy (at Sorø Academy) while he was alive.

Tributes 

Norwegian Edvard Grieg composed the Holberg Suite (opus 40) to honor Holberg. The suite is in the style of country dances from Holberg's time.  In 1911 Johan Halvorsen composed incidental music for a production of Holberg's Barselstuen (The Lying-in Room) in Oslo. Halvorsen later arranged the music into his Suite Ancienne op. 31, which he dedicated to the memory of Holberg.

The Norwegian University of Bergen awards the Holberg International Memorial Prize. The 4.5 million kroner (ca. €520,000) endowed prize was awarded to Julia Kristeva in 2004, to Jürgen Habermas in 2005, and to Shmuel Eisenstadt in 2006.

There is a town named after Holberg on northern Vancouver Island, British Columbia, Canada. It was founded by Danish immigrants in 1907.

Dan Shore's opera The Beautiful Bridegroom, for six sopranos, is based on Holberg's last play, Den forvandlede Brudgom.

There is a statue of Holberg and a boulevard named after him (Holbergsallmenningen) in the centre of Bergen, Norway.
A crater on Mercury is named for him.

Written works

Comedies 

 Den Politiske Kandestøber, 1722 (Eng. The Political Tinker / The Pewterer turned Politician)
 Den vægelsindede, 1722 (Eng. The Waverer / The Weathercock)
 Jean de France eller Hans Frandsen, 1722 (Eng. Jean de France)
 Jeppe på bjerget eller den forvandlede Bonde, 1722 (Eng. Jeppe of the Hill, or The Transformed Peasant)
 Mester Gert Westphaler, 1722 (Eng. Gert Westphaler)
 Barselstuen, 1723 (Eng. The Lying-in Room)
 Den ellefte Junii, 1723 (Eng. The Eleventh of June)
 Jacob von Tyboe eller den stortalende Soldat, 1723 (Eng. Jacob von Tyboe, or The Bragging Soldier)
 Ulysses von Ithacia, 1723 (Eng. Ulysses of Ithaca)
 Erasmus Montanus eller Rasmus Berg, 1723 (Eng. Erasmus Montanus or Rasmus Berg)
 Don Ranudo de Colibrados, 1723
 Uden Hoved og Hale, 1723 (Eng. Without Head or Tail)
 Den Stundesløse, 1723 (Eng. The Fidget)
 Hexerie eller Blind Allarm, 1723 (Eng. Witchcraft or False Alert)
 Melampe, 1723
 Det lykkelige Skibbrud, 1724 (Eng. The Happy Capsize)
 Det Arabiske Pulver, 1724 (Eng. The Arabian Powder)
 Mascarade, 1724 (Eng. Masquerade)
 Julestuen, 1724 (Eng. The Christmas Party)
 De Usynlige, 1724 (Eng. The Invisible / The Masked Ladies)
 Diderich Menschenskraek, 1724 (Eng. Diderich the Terrible)
 Kildereisen, 1725 (Eng. The journey to the source / The source Journey)
 Henrich og Pernille, 1724–1726 (Eng. Henrik and Pernille)
 Den pantsatte Bondedreng, 1726 (Eng. The Pawned Farmers helper / The Peasant in Pawn)
 Pernilles korte Frøkenstand, 1727 (Eng. Pernille's Brief Experience as a Lady)
 Den Danske Comoedies Liigbegængelse, 1727 (Eng. Funeral of Danish Comedy)
 Den honette Ambition, 1731 (Eng. The honest/honourable ambition)
 Den Forvandlede Brudgom, 1753 (Eng. The Changed Bridegroom)
 Plutus eller Proces imellom Fattigdom og Riigdom, publ. 1753
 Husspøgelse eller Abracadabra, publ. 1753 (Eng. The house's Ghost or Abracadabra)
 Philosophus udi egen Indbildning, publ. 1754
 Republiqven eller det gemeene Bedste, publ. 1754
 Sganarels Rejse til det philosophiske Land, publ. 1754 (Eng. Sganarel's Journey to the Land of the Philosophers)

Poems 
 Peder Paars, 1720
 fire Skæmtedigte, 1722 (Eng. Four poems for fun)
 Metamorphosis eller Forvandlinger, 1726 (Eng. Metamorphosis or Changes)

Novels 

 Nicolai Klimii iter subterraneum, 1741. (Translated to Danish by Hans Hagerup in 1742 as Niels Klims underjordiske Rejse.) (Eng. Niels Klim's Underground Travels or Nicolai Klimii's subterranean Journey or The Journey of Niels Klim to the World Underground Bison Books, 2004. )

Essays 
 Moralske Tanker, 1744 (Eng. Moral thoughts)
 Epistler, 1748–54
 Moralske Fabler, 1751 (Eng. Moral Fables)
 Tre latinske levnedsbreve, 1728–1743

Historical works 
 Introduction til de fornemste Europæiske Rigers Historier, 1711 (Eng. Introduction to the Greatest European Empires Histories)
 Morals Kierne eller Introduction til Naturens og Folke-Rettens Kundskab, 1716 (Eng. The Core of Morality or Introduction to Natural and International Law)
 Dannemarks og Norges Beskrivelse, 1729 (Eng. Denmark's and Norway's Description)
 Dannemarks Riges Historie, 1732–35 (Eng. The Danish Empire/Kingdom's History)
 Den berømmelige Norske Handel-Stad Bergens Beskrivelse, 1737 (Eng. The Famous Norwegian Commercial Hub Bergen's Description)
 Almindelig Kirke-Historie, 1738 (Eng. General Church History)
 Den jødiske Historie fra Verdens Begyndelse, fortsat til disse Tider, 1742 (Eng. The Jewish History From the Beginning of the World, Continued till Present Day/These Times)
 Adskillige store Heltes og berømmelige Mænds sammenlignede Historier, 1739–53 (Eng. Several Great Heroes' and Famous Men's Compared Histories)
 Adskillige Heltinders og navnkundige Damers sammenlignede Historier, 1745 (Eng. Several Heroines' and Noteworthy Ladies' Compared Histories)

Memoir 
 Memoirs of Lewis Holberg, 1737 (published in English, 1827)

See also
 Christian Gotlob Mengel

Notes

References 
 A primary source is Ludvig Holberg's Latin Testament. It can be recommended to use: Holberg, Ludvig, and Aage Kragelund. Ludvig Holbergs tre levnedsbreve 1728–1743. København: G.E.C. Gads Forlag, 1965. The edition contains an introduction, Holberg's texts in both Latin and Danish, commentaries and an index.
 
 Thomsen, Ole B. Embedsstudiernes universitet en undersøgelse af Københavns universitets fundats af 1788 som grundlag for vores nuværende studiestruktur. København: Akademisk Forlag, 1975. 
 Grethe Ilsøe: Juridisk eksamen for ustuderede. Kollektiv biografi af 1. kandidatgeneration (eksamensårgangene 1736–65) i: Personalhistorisk Tidsskrift, 1985, nr. 2
 Jens Hougaard: Ludvig Holberg. The Playwright and his age up to 1730, Odense University Press. 1993. .
 Caterina Marrone: Le lingue utopiche, Nuovi Equilibri, Viterbo, 2004 [1995], p. 338, 
Bent Holm: Ludvig Holberg. A Danish Playwright on the European Stage. Masquerade, Comedy, Satire. Vienna: Hollitzer, 2018. .

External links 

 
 
 
 Complete works of Ludvig Holberg (Danish originals) at Archive for Danish Literature
 A sound recording of Holberg's comedy The Arabian Powder at Lost Plays.com
 Ludvig Holberg's writings – a Danish-Norwegian website under construction

 
1684 births
1754 deaths
People educated at the Bergen Cathedral School
18th-century Danish dramatists and playwrights
Danish male writers
18th-century Danish memoirists
Danish essayists
Norwegian dramatists and playwrights
Norwegian essayists
Writers from Copenhagen
University of Copenhagen alumni
Writers from Bergen
Norwegian emigrants to Denmark
18th-century Latin-language writers
18th-century male writers
17th-century Danish people
18th-century Danish writers
18th-century Danish scientists
17th-century Norwegian people
18th-century Norwegian novelists
17th-century Norwegian writers
18th-century Norwegian writers
18th-century Norwegian scientists
Norwegian male novelists
Danish male dramatists and playwrights
Rectors of the University of Copenhagen
Male essayists
18th-century essayists
Enlightenment philosophers